Chiaiano is a north-western quarter of  Naples, with a population of about 23,000.

Geography
Chiaiano is a hilly and wooded area that lies between Camaldoli and the Campi Flegrei.

History
Archaeologically, the area is of interest, displaying remnants of pre-and-non-Roman inhabitants such as the Oscans and Samnites.

Since the earthquake of 1980, it is one of the outlying areas that has undergone extreme urbanization—that is, large tracts of public housing to provide for those left homeless by that event.

Twin towns
It is twinned with Manhattan, the commercial quarter of New York and has received the certificate of calmer quarter of the city.

Notes and references

Quartieri of Naples
Former municipalities of the Province of Naples